Focas may refer to:

 Jean Focas (1909–1969), Greek-French astronomer
 Spiros Focás (born 1937), Greek actor
 Focas (lunar crater), a crater on the Moon
 Focas (Martian crater), a crater on Mars

See also
 Phocas
 Foca (disambiguation)